The blue iguana is a lizard native to Grand Cayman.

Blue Iguana can also refer to:
 The Blue Iguana, a comedy crime film from 1988
 Dancing at the Blue Iguana, an erotic drama film from 2000
 Blue Iguana (2018 film), a romantic comedy thriller
 Blue Iguana, the working title of a comedy film from 2022
Blue Iguana, a color phase of, or Axanthic Green Iguana (Iguana iguana).